Old Mamsell's Secret (German:Das Geheimnis der alten Mamsell) is a 1925 German silent film directed by Paul Merzbach and starring Frida Richard, Guido Parish and Marcella Albani.

The film's art direction was by Andrej Andrejew and Gustav A. Knauer. It was distributed by the German branch of Fox Film.

Cast
 Frida Richard as Dortje van Dekker  
 Guido Parish as Vladimir Orlowski  
 Marcella Albani as Felicitas van Dekker - van Dekkers Tochter  
 Hans Mierendorff as Konsul van Dekker  
 Julia Serda as Regina van Dekker  
 Harry Halm as Harry  
 Anton Pointner as Adrian  
 Alexandra Sorina as Tora Brink  
 Max Winter as Hendrik - Diener beim Konsul  
 Charly Berger as Chauffeur  
 Hermann Picha as Schuster 
 Gerhard Ritterband as Schusterjunge 
 Frederic Zelnik

References

Bibliography
 Jill Nelmes & Jule Selbo. Women Screenwriters: An International Guide. Palgrave Macmillan, 2015.

External links

1925 films
Films of the Weimar Republic
Films directed by Paul Merzbach
German silent feature films
Films based on German novels
German black-and-white films
Fox Film films
1920s American films